Diaphus pacificus, the Pacific headlightfish, is a species of lanternfish 
found in the Pacific Ocean.

References

Myctophidae
Taxa named by Albert Eide Parr
Fish described in 1931